The Japanese anchovy (Engraulis japonicus) is a schooling fish of the family Engraulidae. It is common in the Pacific Ocean south from the Sea of Okhotsk, widespread in the Sea of Japan, Yellow Sea, and East China Sea, and near the coasts of Japan. They live up to 2–3 years, similar to European anchovy. They spawn from Taiwan to southern Sakhalin.

Gallery

Sources
 Engraulis japonicus at FishBase

Japanese anchovy
Fish of Japan
Fish of Korea
Marine fauna of East Asia
Anchovies
Taxa named by Coenraad Jacob Temminck
Taxa named by Hermann Schlegel
Japanese anchovy